GEA Bock GmbH is part of the GEA Group. The company is a manufacturer of compressors and condensing units for stationary and mobile refrigeration and air-conditioning. The products are exclusively used in commercial and industrial environments.

History
In 1932, Wilhelm Bock and Hans Göldner founded the company in Stuttgart with the purpose of installing and repairing refrigeration units. In 1937, the company moved into a bigger building in Nürtingen and started its own production.

In 1938, Hans Göldner left the company and was replaced by Hugo Bock, resulting in the new company Bock & Co. KG.

Bock also turned to the field of automotive air conditioning systems in the 1960s, becoming one of the pioneers in the process. The company developed and built the first air conditioning units "made in Germany" for cars that were not only used in luxury cars - even the Volkswagen beetle had a Bock air-conditioning system.

In December 2009, the Bock EFC system received the BMU (German Environment Ministry) "Climate Protection and Refrigeration Technology" award in Refrigeration Technology from Norbert Röttgen, the German Minister for Environment.

Since 31 March 2011, Bock is part of the Segment Refrigeration Technologies of the GEA Group and changed its name into GEA Bock GmbH. GEA Refrigeration Technologies – international market leader for industrial refrigeration systems - have specialized in the development, construction, installation, service and maintenance of innovative key components and technical solutions. Typical applications are cooling processes for the food and beverage industries, marine, oil and gas industries, buildings, as well as leisure facilities such as indoor ski centers and ice-skating rinks.

Products
Mobile compressors are mainly used for the air-conditioning of buses.  Bock is the leading European manufacturer in this segment,   and supplier of all major system- and bus manufacturers. Their  compressors are also used worldwide in trains and ships for cooling and air-conditioning.

In the case of stationary applications, examples can be found in all areas of refrigeration, such as supermarkets, warehouses, fruit stores, bakeries, the beverage and chemical industry etc. During recent years, building air-conditioning has become another important sector of application.

The firm produces Semi-Hermetic Compressors (either suction gas cooled. air-cooled or radial-piston),  Open Type Compressors, Vehicle Compressors, and Open type Motor Compressors

Production and Subsidiaries
Bock has four production plants
 GEA Bock GmbH (Frickenhausen, Germany)
 GEA Bock Czech s.r.o. (Stríbro, Czech Republic)
 GEA Refrigeration India Private Limited (Vadodara, India)
 GEA Bock Compressors (Hangzhou) Co., Ltd.  (Hangzhou, Zhejiang, China)

The distribution in Germany is done by specialised refrigeration wholesales. Overseas, licensed dealers are selling Bock products in about 60 countries. Further processing companies in the inland and abroad are delivered directly. The following subsidiary companies and joint ventures are distributing the products directly:
 GEA Bock GmbH Vertriebsbüro Österreich (Graz, Österreich)
 GEA Bock GmbH (Lyon, Frankreich)
 GEA Refrigeration India Private Limited (Vadorara, Indien)
 GEA Bock (Thailand) Co., Ltd. (Bangkok, Thailand)
 GEA Refrigeration Malaysia Sdn Bhd(Petaling Jaya, Malaysia)
 GEA Refrigeration Singapore Pte Ltd  (Singapur, Singapur)
 Office Shanghai GEA Bock Compressors (Hangzhou) Co., Ltd. (Shanghai, China)
 GEA Refrigeration Australia Pty. Ltd.  (Rosebery, Australien)
 PT. GEA Refrigeration Indonesia (Jakarta, Indonesia)

Companies listed on the Frankfurt Stock Exchange
Companies based in Baden-Württemberg
Engineering companies of Germany